Stanley Chioza (born 28 May 1981) is a former Zimbabwean cricketer. A right-handed batsman and right-arm medium-fast bowler, he played four first-class matches for Manicaland during the 2003–04 Logan Cup. As of 2021, he is an assistant coach of the Southern Rocks.

References

External links
 
 

1981 births
Living people
Cricketers from Harare
Zimbabwean cricketers
Zimbabwean cricket coaches
Manicaland cricketers
Mashonaland cricketers